The Sky Is Falling or Sky Is Falling may refer to:

Literature 
 The Sky Is Falling, the catch phrase of the fable Henny Penny, also known as Chicken Little and Chicken Licken
 The Sky Is Falling (Sheldon novel), by Sidney Sheldon
 The Sky Is Falling (Del Rey novel), by Lester Del Rey
 The Sky Is Falling (Pearson novel), by Kit Pearson
 The Sky Is Falling: A Maximum Ride Novel, re-titled Fang: A Maximum Ride Novel, the sixth book in the Maximum Ride series by James Patterson
 The Sky Is Falling (Adderson novel), by Caroline Adderson
 The Sky Is Falling (play), by Tad Mosel

Film 
 The Sky Is Falling (1979 film), a 1979 film directed by Silvio Narizzano, starring Dennis Hopper             
 The Sky Is Falling (2000 film), a 2000 American independent film,  written and directed by Florrie Lurence, starring Dedee Pfeiffer and Teri Garr
 The Sky Is Falling (2000 film), aka Il Cielo cade, an Italian film, directed by Andrea Frazzi & Antonio Frazzi, starring Isabella Rossellini

Music 
 Sky Is Falling (Grainger), a 2002 album by Grainger
 The Sky Is Falling (album), a 1980 album by Randy Stonehill
 The Sky Is Falling and I Want My Mommy, a 1991 album by Nomeansno with Jello Biafra
 "The Sky Is Falling", a 2007 song on Conviction, by Aiden
 "The Sky Is Falling", a 1997 song on Marigold Sky, by Hall & Oates
 "The Sky Is Falling", a 2007 song on The Tempest, by The Insane Clown Posse
 "Sky Is Falling", a 2002 song on Stanley Climbfall, by Lifehouse
 "Sky Is Falling" (Natalie Duncan song), 2012, on Devil in Me "The Sky Is Fallin'", a 2002 song on Songs for the Deaf, by Queens of the Stone Age
 "The Sky Is Falling", a 2007 song on Southern Born Killers, by Stuck Mojo
 "The Sky Is Falling", a 2008 song on The Alchemy Index Vols. III & IV, by Thrice
 "Where I End And You Begin (The Sky is Falling In)", a 2003 song on Hail to the Thief by Radiohead

Video games
 The Sky is Falling'' (video game), a game for the VIC-20